Gianni Rizzo (1925–1992) was an Italian film actor. Between 1944 and 1986 he appeared in over seventy films and television productions, in a variety of supporting roles. His screen roles included parts in a number of peplum films, such as The Vengeance of Ursus (1961). He also appeared in Italian spy films, spaghetti westerns, and played the villain in the 1967 Perry Rhodan movie, Mission Stardust. He died in 1992 at age 66.

Selected filmography

 Macario contro Zagomar (1949)
 City of Pain (1949) - Sergio
 A Night of Fame (1949) - Max
 Totò Le Mokò (1949) - Cicerone, Casbah tourguide (uncredited)
 The Crossroads (1951) - Beppe detto il Curato
 Three Steps North (1951) - The Greek
 Wolves Hunt at Night (1952) - Le commissaire italien
 A Mother Returns (1952) - Ex-amante di Elena
 Una croce senza nome (1952)
 Serenata amara (1952) - Peppe
 The Phantom Musketeer (1952) - Pierre de La Tour
 I Chose Love (1953)
 Puccini (1953)
 Carmen proibita (1953)
 Tripoli, Beautiful Land of Love (1954) - Rudi
 Disowned (1954)
 Pirate of the Half Moon (1957) - Visconte di Grand
 Orizzonte infuocato (1957) - Vasco
 Head of a Tyrant (1959) - Ozia
 Avventura a Capri (1959) - Antonio il parucchiere
 Le secret du Chevalier d'Éon (1959) - (uncredited)
 The Pirate and the Slave Girl (1959) - Nikopoulos
 La notte del grande assalto (1959) - The Maltese
 Agosto, donne mie non vi conosco (1959) - Proprietario del night-club
 Cavalcata selvaggia (1960)
 Gli scontenti (1961)
 The Vengeance of Ursus (1961) - Licurgo
 Zorro in the Court of Spain (1962) - Don Carlos
 I due della legione (1962) - Suprut
 Lo smemorato di Collegno (1962) - Ragionere
 Zorro and the Three Musketeers (1963) - King Philip
 Slave Queen of Babylon (1963) - Ghelas
 The Ten Gladiators (1963) - Claudius Nero
 Sword in the Shadows (1963) - Giorgio
 Mission to Hell (1964) - John Yakiris
 Triumph of the Ten Gladiators (1964) - Sesto Vitorio
 3 Avengers (1964) - Teomoco
 Spartacus and the Ten Gladiators (1964) - Senator Giulio Varro
 Le bambole (1965) - Hotel Manager
 Desperate Mission (1965) - Barrow
 I soldi (1965)
 Me, Me, Me... and the Others (1966) - Politician with glasses
 Anónima de asesinos (1966) - Stephanolopoulus
 Vacanze sulla neve (1966)
 Requiem for a Secret Agent (1966) - Atenopoulos
 Lotus Flowers for Miss Quon (1967) - Blackie Lee
 Mission Stardust (1967) - Car Seller
 Desert Commandos (1967) - Perrier
 Face to Face (1967) - Williams
 If You Meet Sartana Pray for Your Death (1968) - Alman
 Run, Man, Run (1968) - Mayor Christopher Bannington
 Sabata (1969) - Judge O'Hara
 Adiós, Sabata (1970) - Folgen
 La califfa (1970) - Un industriale
 Between Miracles (1971) - Priest
 The Decameron (1971) - Father Superior
 Return of Sabata (1971) - Jeremy Sweeney
 Alfredo, Alfredo (1972) - A Judge
 Bawdy Tales (1973) - Il cardinale
 Questa volta ti faccio ricco! (1974) - Giorgiakis
 Anno uno (1974) - Dirigente DC torinese
 Who Breaks... Pays (1975) - Mister Paul
 Beach House (1977) - L'allenatore
 The Uranium Conspiracy (1978) - The Captain
 The Lonely Lady (1983) - Gino Paoluzzi
 Everybody in Jail (1984) - Minister Euclide
 The Name of the Rose (1986) - Päpstliche Gesandte #5 (final film role)

References

Bibliography
 Hughes, Howard. Cinema Italiano: The Complete Guide from Classics to Cult. I.B.Tauris, 2011.

External links

1925 births
1992 deaths
Italian male film actors
People from Brindisi
20th-century Italian male actors